The Kingdom of Romania was under Fascist rule for a total of six months, comprising two separate regimes headed by two different parties. First there was the National Christian Party between December 1937 and February 1938, then the Iron Guard between September 1940 and January 1941. The sole-legal party 1938 to 1940 National Renaissance Front was also called fascist like the dictator Ion Antonescu (1940–1944).

National Christian Party

The National Christian Party was created in 1935, from the merger between Octavian Goga's National Agrarian Party and Alexandru C. Cuza's National Christian Defense League. This new party had a strong Fascist tinge, particularly in trying to emulate Italian corporatism. Following the 1937 Romanian general election, Goga was appointed Prime Minister on 28 December 1937. His term ended on 10 February 1938. During his cabinet's brief rule, antisemitic laws were introduced and Romania's foreign policy was shifted towards Germany, Italy and Japan.

Goga's cabinet was divided between pro-Western and pro-Axis ministers. Such division reflected King Carol's decision to steer a neutral course between the Great Powers. Thus, the King was still ultimately in control of foreign policy. At that time, Goga was likely the most well-known Romanian in Germany. Noteworthy pro-Germans in Goga's cabinet included Ion Gigurtu (Minister of Trade and Industry) and Eugen Savu (Minister of Finance), while pro-Westerners were represented by Armand Călinescu (Minister of the Interior) and General Ion Antonescu (Minister of National Defense). The Minister of Foreign Affairs was Istrate Micescu, a member of the National Christian Party and thus a pro-German. However, he pledged to follow Carol's commands. He made contradictory statements: on the one hand he pledged to create lasting links between Romania and the Axis (31 December 1937), but later pronounced himself in favor of the League of Nations and Czechoslovakia. Goga himself, stated his wishes for a new commercial treaty with Germany, but also for keeping the traditional links with France as well as strengthening ties with Britain. Ultimately, upon taking office as Prime Minister, he sent telegrams of friendship to Czechoslovakia, France, Poland, Yugoslavia, Italy and Germany. Despite being a Germanophile, Goga still made it clear to Hitler, in his New Year telegram, that close ties with Germany would depend on the Reich's recognition of Romanian territorial integrity. Unwilling to alienate Hungary, Hitler simply sent Goga his "gratitude" for the declaration. Despite all these, Goga's cabinet was the first to include a vocal pro-German element for the first time since the First World War, and Hitler described the coming to power of his government as the "first happy event of the New Year". 

As Goga was unable to form a parliamentary majority, his party having secured only 9% of the vote, he dissolved the Parliament before it could convene. Since Goga's government issued laws and decrees without the backing of the parliament, his regime was effectively a dictatorship.

On 8 February, Goga came to an understanding with Corneliu Zelea Codreanu, the leader of the Iron Guard. Because the main reason King Carol appointed Goga as Prime Minister to begin with was to serve as a measure against the Iron Guard, Goga was promptly dismissed within forty-eight hours.

Antisemitic legislation
Goga's government inaugurated a radical antisemitic internal policy. It introduced legislation aimed at curtailing what was seen by many Romanians as the disproportionate position of the country's Jewish minority in the economy and higher education. As a result, Jews boycotted work and withdrew their money from the banks, thus bringing the economy to a standstill. In the end, Western displeasure at Goga's antisemitic policies contributed to his fall from power on 10 February 1938, when he was dismissed by the King. By choosing the antisemitic National Christian Party to form a government, the King hoped to draw off support from the more popular Iron Guard, which had gained 15.6% of the votes during the December 1937 election (by comparison, the National Christian Party gained less than 10% of the votes). Under Goga, antisemitism became state policy. On 30 December, several "Jewish" newspapers were banned. Other measures included the interdiction of Jews to sell alcohol and tobacco, a ban on hiring foreigners (including Jews) in cafes and restaurants, and the suspension of the right to practice their job of 1,540 registered Jewish lawyers in Bucharest. These measures culminated in a decree promulgated on 21 January 1938, which stripped 225,222 Jews of their Romanian citizenship. Although the Goga government soon fell, this decree was not cancelled, and this large batch of Jews all had their rights as Romanian citizens revoked by 15 September 1939. Despite the fall of Goga, antisemitism had become too strong of a policy for any subsequent government to afford ignoring it. Goga's appointment as Prime Minister on 28 December 1937 was seen as a formal approval of Fascist violence. Romania slipped into chaos within weeks: Jew-beating became a daily occurrence, tens of thousands of Lăncieri (the paramilitary wing of the National Christian Party) carried out street violence and gang warfare against the Iron Guard, shops were closed and the exchange rate collapsed. Romania appeared to be on the brink of civil war.

Legacy
Goga's government was the second antisemitic government in Europe, after that of Nazi Germany, stripping one third of Romanian Jews of their citizenship. Because of its antisemitic measures, the Goga-Cuza government has been referred to as "more Nazi than the Germans". 

The Romanian King used the failures of the Goga government to proclaim his own royal dictatorship and to blame the country's condition on the system of parliamentary democracy. He actually took full power in order to personally deal with the rising Iron Guard. Before February was out, a new Constitution came into force under which the Parliament had been relegated to an advisory role, with the real power being held by the King and his Crown Council. Goga's successor as Prime Minister was Patriarch Miron Cristea.

Octavian Goga is today remembered as one of Romania's national poets, his entire political career being almost completely forgotten by the Romanian public. For instance, the "Octavian Goga District Library" in Cluj-Napoca is named after him.

National Renaissance Front

Iron Guard

Ion Antonescu

See also
National Renaissance Front
Ion Antonescu

References 

Kingdom of Romania
Fascist states
Politics of Romania
1930s in Romania
1940s in Romania
Iron Guard
Greater Romania